Paraactinoptera is a genus of tephritid  or fruit flies in the family Tephritidae.

Species
Paraactinoptera collessi Hardy & Drew, 1996
Paraactinoptera danielsi Hancock & Drew, 2003

References

Tephritinae
Tephritidae genera
Diptera of Australasia